Freehold Township is a township in Warren County, Pennsylvania, United States. The population was 1,217 at the 2020 census, down from 1,510 at the 2010 census.

Geography

Demographics

As of the census of 2000, there were 1,402 people, 463 households, and 364 families residing in the township.  The population density was 39.4 people per square mile (15.2/km2).  There were 531 housing units at an average density of 14.9/sq mi (5.8/km2).  The racial makeup of the township was 98.79% White, 0.14% African American, 0.14% Native American, 0.14% Asian, and 0.78% from two or more races.

There were 463 households, out of which 40.2% had children under the age of 18 living with them, 65.0% were married couples living together, 6.3% had a female householder with no husband present, and 21.2% were non-families. 19.0% of all households were made up of individuals, and 7.6% had someone living alone who was 65 years of age or older.  The average household size was 3.03 and the average family size was 3.47.

In the township the population was spread out, with 35.7% under the age of 18, 6.1% from 18 to 24, 27.1% from 25 to 44, 21.1% from 45 to 64, and 10.0% who were 65 years of age or older.  The median age was 32 years. For every 100 females, there were 97.7 males.  For every 100 females age 18 and over, there were 104.3 males.

The median income for a household in the township was $34,479, and the median income for a family was $38,095. Males had a median income of $28,409 versus $23,125 for females. The per capita income for the township was $13,103.  About 10.3% of families and 19.9% of the population were below the poverty line, including 34.3% of those under age 18 and 11.1% of those age 65 or over.

References

Townships in Warren County, Pennsylvania
Townships in Pennsylvania